RHSM may stand for:

 Red Hat Subscription Manager - content delivery for Red Hat customers
 Rowland Hall-St. Mark's School - a school in Utah